P. chinense may refer to:
 Phellodendron chinense, a plant species
 Polygonum chinense, a synonym of Persicaria chinensis, a plant species found in Malaysia

See also